KUAT-TV (channel 6) is a PBS member television station in Tucson, Arizona, United States. It is the television station of the University of Arizona (UA) and broadcasts from  studios in the Modern Languages Building on the UA campus. Two high-power transmitters broadcast its programming: KUAT-TV itself on Mount Bigelow and KUAS-TV (channel 27) on Tumamoc Hill, west of downtown Tucson, which provides coverage to northwest Tucson and communities west of Mount Lemmon that are shielded from the Mount Bigelow transmitter. There is also a translator in Duncan. KUAT-TV and the UA's radio stations, KUAT-FM and KUAZ, are grouped under the unified brand of Arizona Public Media (AZPM).

KUAT-TV is the oldest public television station in the state, beginning broadcasts in 1959. In addition to airing national PBS and public television programming, it produces several local shows focusing on southern Arizona life and issues.

History

Tucson had been allocated noncommercial educational channel 6 in 1952, but it was not until 1958 that the UA prepared an application to build a television station to use it. It proposed to initially broadcast two hours a night, five nights a week. The university had already remodeled Herring Hall to house radio and television studios, with the latter occupying a space once used as part of a gymnasium and auditorium. Filed on April 3, the application and permit were granted on July 16, sending $40,000 of Ford Foundation monies the university's way to begin construction. After the university rejected the first two bids for the job as too high and re-bid the task out, the tower was erected in November to support the antenna for the new station; while that happened, the university made its first telecast—a closed-circuit event in which a pharmacology class watched a demonstration of blood pressure techniques.

The first test pattern went out on February 6, and KUAT launched on March 8, 1959, as the first public television station in Arizona. It was an affiliate of National Educational Television (NET), forerunner to PBS, from 1959 through 1970, when PBS replaced NET. In addition to university programs, the Tucson Unified School District was part of its operation, with a weekly show summarizing school activities. That fall, the first daytime educational broadcasts were made, consisting of university classes.

In 1964, the university prepared an expansion of the initial anemic facility, which had an effective radiated power of just 944 watts. The Federal Aviation Administration approved the tower site, but the university decided to relocate its main transmitter to Mount Bigelow, already in use by the three commercial stations in town, after protests from the Air Line Pilots Association over the proximity of the mast to the Tucson International Airport. The new studios and transmitter would be color-capable. The Arizona Board of Regents approved the plans in April 1967, and color transmission from the new studios and transmitter began on October 1, 1968. In preparation, K71BQ, a channel 71 translator, was built at the Tumamoc Hill site to serve neighborhoods in northwest Tucson that are shaded from Mount Bigelow by terrain. A day before the color conversion, on September 30, 1968, the University of Arizona returned to radio for the first time since the 1920s after receiving the donation of KFIF (1550 AM), which became KUAT (and is now KUAZ), from John Walton. In 1977, construction work began on a satellite dish in a vacant swimming pool south of the Bear Down Gymnasium, allowing the station to receive PBS programming via satellite.

In the 1980s, KUAT upgraded its service to the northwest side. As early as 1982, plans existed to replace K71BQ with a higher-power translator on channel 27. This became reality as K27AT in December 1985. As channel 27 had been designated for noncommercial full-power use, the university filed to build out a full-power facility on channel 27 in 1985; this was completed as KUAS-TV in July 1988. In 1994, KUAT-TV launched the UA Channel, a public access channel featuring university content and lectures.

After the university received a $671,000 grant, the two transmitters were converted to digital in 2002 and 2003, with KUAS-TV on Tumamoc Hill being switched first and becoming the first digital television service in Tucson. The Arizona Public Media umbrella name for KUAT radio and television was adopted in 2009.

Steep budget cuts to higher education in Arizona strongly affected Arizona Public Media's budget during the Great Recession, as 26 percent of it came from the university. Arizona Illustrated, a formerly daily program, converted to being taped three times a week, alongside other cost-cutting measures. After providing $2.6 million in cash to AZPM in the 2013–2014 school year, the University of Arizona planned cuts for 2014–2015 of $400,000 and continued cuts until 2019.

In 2021, the UA announced it was exploring the construction of a new $45 million complex for AZPM south of the campus at The Bridges, home to a UA tech park, having already raised 75 percent of the projected cost without launching a public campaign.

Local programming
In 1980, KUAT began producing Arizona Illustrated, its flagship weekly newsmagazine on local public affairs issues, at a time when its local program production was seen as minimal outside of Tucson city council meetings. Initially aired daily, it evolved from a features show to a news and analysis program. University students handle most of the production of Arizona Illustrated, providing them with valuable hands-on experience.

No longer produced but still in reruns on some PBS stations is The Desert Speaks, co-produced with the Arizona-Sonora Desert Museum from 1990 to 2018. It was the successor to a previous program that aired on KVOA and later KOLD-TV, which had been in production since 1953.

In 2007, KUAT produced the documentary Phoenix Mars Mission: Ashes to Ice, which became the first of the station's productions to air nationally on PBS.

Technical information

Subchannels
The stations' signals carry the same multiplex of subchannels:

When KUAT and KUAS first began digital broadcasting, they did not carry all the same subchannels. Initially, four subchannels were broadcast during the day and then closed down to allow the transmission of one high-definition channel.

With the dropping of PBS Kids in 2005, KUAT programmed its own children's channel, KUAT Kids. On 6.3, V-me started broadcasting on November 30, 2007, while .1 and .2 were PBS in high and standard definition. On December 1, 2011, the station's affiliation with Create was dropped for an independent lifestyle channel branded Ready TV. 

On October 11, 2016, AZPM began broadcasting the same subchannels from both transmitters. V-me moved to cable only from 6.2, making way for PBS Kids from the Mount Bigelow transmitter, while the UA Channel became an online-only service. ReadyTV and World programming would share the same channel .3 and while PBS Kids would be on .2. In 2017, the third subchannel was changed again, this time to a new complementary service known as PBS 6 Plus.

Analog-to-digital transition
While Arizona Public Media had intended to shut off the analog signals of both KUAT-TV and KUAS-TV on June 12, 2009, the national digital transition date, KUAT-TV was removed from analog service 10 weeks earlier than expected on March 31 due to damage to the analog equipment on Mount Bigelow. The stations' digital signals remained on their pre-transition UHF channels 30 and 28, respectively, using virtual channels 6 and 27. The KUAS-TV transmitter was used as part of the SAFER Act to broadcast transition information announcements.

References

External links

University of Arizona
Television channels and stations established in 1959
1959 establishments in Arizona
UAT-TV